Since Illinois became a U.S. state in 1818, it has sent congressional delegations to the United States Senate and United States House of Representatives. Each state elects two senators to serve for six years, and members of the House to two-year terms. Before becoming a state, the Illinois Territory elected a non-voting delegate at-large to Congress from 1812 to 1818.

These are tables of congressional delegations from Illinois to the United States Senate and the United States House of Representatives.

Current delegation 

Illinois's current congressional delegation in the  consists of its two senators, both of whom are Democrats, and its 17 representatives: 14 Democrats and 3 Republicans.

The current dean of the Illinois delegation is Senator Dick Durbin, having served in the Senate since 1997 and in Congress since 1983.

United States Senate

United States House of Representatives

1812–1818: 1 non-voting delegate 
Starting on December 3, 1812, Illinois Territory sent a non-voting delegate to the House.

Part of the area of Illinois Territory became the State of Illinois on December 3, 1818.

1818–1833: 1 seat
Following statehood on December 3, 1818, Illinois had one seat in the House.

1833–1843: 3 seats 
Following the 1830 census, Illinois was apportioned three seats, all elected via single member districts.

1843–1853: 7 seats 
Following the 1840 census, Illinois was apportioned seven seats.

1853–1863: 9 seats 
Following the 1850 census, Illinois was apportioned nine seats.

1863–1873: 14 seats 
Following the 1860 census, Illinois was apportioned 14 seats, 13 of which were elected from single member districts and 1 elected at-large statewide.

1873–1883: 19 seats 
Following the 1870 census, Illinois was apportioned 19 seats, all elected via single member districts.

1883–1895: 20 seats 
Following the 1860 census, Illinois was apportioned 20 seats.

1893–1903: 22 seats 
Following the 1890 census, Illinois was apportioned 22 seats. Until 1895, 20 seats were elected from single member districts and 2 were elected at-large statewide. In 1895, Illinois redistricted all of its seats.

1903–1913: 25 seats 
Following the 1900 census, Illinois was apportioned 25 seats.

1913–1943: 27 seats 
Following the 1910 census, Illinois was apportioned 27 seats, 25 of which were elected from single member districts and 2 were elected at-large statewide.

1943–1953: 26 seats 
Following the 1940 census, Illinois was apportioned 26 seats. Until 1949, 25 seats were elected from single member districts and 1 was elected at-large statewide. From 1949, all 26 seats were redistricted.

1953–1963: 25 seats 
Following the 1950 census, Illinois was apportioned 25 seats, all of which were elected from single-member districts.

1963–1983: 24 seats 
Following the 1960 census, Illinois was apportioned 24 seats.

1983–1993: 22 seats 
Following the 1980 census, Illinois was apportioned 22 seats.

1993–2003: 20 seats 
Following the 1990 census, Illinois was apportioned 20 seats.

2003–2013: 19 seats 
Following the 2000 census, Illinois was apportioned 19 seats.

2013–2023: 18 seats 
Following the 2010 census, Illinois was apportioned 18 seats.

From 2023-Present: 17 seats 
Following the 2020 census, Illinois was apportioned 17 seats.

Key

See also 

List of United States congressional districts
Illinois's congressional districts
Political party strength in Illinois

Notes

References 

 
 
Illinois
Politics of Illinois
Congressional delegations